Belvedere railway station is a railway station in South East London between Abbey Wood and Erith. It is served by Southeastern.

A level crossing beyond the western end of the platforms was closed before the westerly extension of the platforms around 1994, and the ticket office and platform shelters were rebuilt soon afterwards.

Services

The typical off-peak service in trains per hour is:
 4 tph to London Cannon Street (2 of these run via  and 2 run via )
 2 tph to 

During the peak hours, the station is served by an additional half-hourly circular service to and from London Cannon Street via  and Lewisham in the clockwise direction and via Greenwich in the anticlockwise direction.

Connections
London Buses routes 180, 229, 401 and 469 serve the station.

References

External links

Railway stations in the London Borough of Bexley
Former South Eastern Railway (UK) stations
Railway stations in Great Britain opened in 1859
Railway stations served by Southeastern
1859 establishments in England